"The Two Cultures" is the first part of an influential 1959 Rede Lecture by British scientist and novelist C. P. Snow which were published in book form as The Two Cultures and the Scientific Revolution the same year. Its thesis was that science and the humanities which represented "the intellectual life of the whole of western society" had become split into "two cultures" and that this division was a major handicap to both in solving the world's problems.

The lecture
The talk was delivered 7 May 1959 in the Senate House, Cambridge, and subsequently published as The Two Cultures and the Scientific Revolution. The lecture and book expanded upon an article by Snow published in the New Statesman of 6 October 1956, also entitled "The Two Cultures".  Published in book form, Snow's lecture was widely read and discussed on both sides of the Atlantic, leading him to write a 1963 follow-up, The Two Cultures: And a Second Look: An Expanded Version of The Two Cultures and the Scientific Revolution.

Snow's position can be summed up by an often-repeated part of the essay:

In 2008, The Times Literary Supplement included The Two Cultures and the Scientific Revolution in its list of the 100 books that most influenced Western public discourse since the Second World War.

Snow's Rede Lecture condemned the British educational system as having, since the Victorian era, over-rewarded the humanities (especially Latin and Greek) at the expense of scientific and engineering education, despite such achievements having been so decisive in winning the Second World War for the Allies. This in practice deprived British elites (in politics, administration, and industry) of adequate preparation to manage the modern scientific world. By contrast, Snow said, German and American schools sought to prepare their citizens equally in the sciences and humanities, and better scientific teaching enabled these countries' rulers to compete more effectively in a scientific age. Later discussion of The Two Cultures tended to obscure Snow's initial focus on differences between British systems (of both schooling and social class) and those of competing countries.

Implications and influence 
The literary critic F. R. Leavis called Snow a "public relations man" for the scientific establishment in his essay Two Cultures?: The Significance of C. P. Snow, published in The Spectator in 1962.  The article attracted a great deal of negative correspondence in the magazine's letters pages.

In his 1963 book Snow appeared to revise his thinking and was more optimistic about the potential of a mediating third culture.  This concept was later picked up in John Brockman's The Third Culture: Beyond the Scientific Revolution. Introducing a reprint of The Two Cultures, Stefan Collini has argued that the passage of time has done much to reduce the cultural divide Snow noticed, but has not removed it entirely.

Stephen Jay Gould's The Hedgehog, the Fox, and the Magister's Pox provides a different perspective. Assuming the dialectical interpretation, it argues that Snow's concept of "two cultures" is not only off the mark, it is a damaging and short-sighted viewpoint, and that it has perhaps led to decades of unnecessary fence-building.

Simon Critchley, in Continental Philosophy: A Very Short Introduction suggests:

That is, Critchley argues that what Snow said represents a resurfacing of a discussion current in the mid-nineteenth century. Critchley describes the Leavis contribution to the making of a controversy as "a vicious ad hominem attack"; going on to describe the debate as "a familiar clash in English cultural history" citing also T. H. Huxley and Matthew Arnold.

In his opening address at the Munich Security Conference in January 2014, the Estonian president Toomas Hendrik Ilves said that the current problems related to security and freedom in cyberspace are the culmination of absence of dialogue between "the two cultures": "Today, bereft of understanding of fundamental issues and writings in the development of liberal democracy, computer geeks devise ever better ways to track people... simply because they can and it's cool. Humanists on the other hand do not understand the underlying technology and are convinced, for example, that tracking meta-data means the government reads their emails."

Antecedents
Contrasting scientific and humanistic knowledge is a repetition of the Methodenstreit of 1890 German universities. A quarrel in 1911 between Benedetto Croce and Giovanni Gentile on the one hand and Federigo Enriques on the other one is believed to have had enduring effects in the separation of the two cultures in Italy and to the predominance of the views of (objective) idealism over those of (logical) positivism. In the social sciences it is also commonly proposed as the quarrel of positivism versus interpretivism.

See also
 Culture war
 The Third Culture
 Science wars
 Consilience: The Unity of Knowledge, a 1998 book written by biologist Edward Osborne Wilson, as an attempt to bridge the gap between "the two cultures"
 Quarrel of the Ancients and the Moderns
 Interdisciplinarity, a movement to cross boundaries between academic disciplines, including the divide between "the two cultures"

References

Further reading
 Burguete, Maria, and Lam, Lui, eds. (2008). Science Matters: Humanities as Complex Systems. World Scientific: Singapore. 
 .
Andrew Sinclair, The Red and the Blue. Intelligence, Treason and the Universities (Coronet Books, Hodder and Stoughten, U.K. 1987) 211 pages

External links
 .
 .
 
 .
 .
 .
 .
 Snow, Charles Percy (1959), "The Two Cultures (The Rede Lecture)".
 .

1959 non-fiction books
British culture
Science and technology in the United Kingdom
Science studies
Science books
Dichotomies
Oxford University Press books
May 1959 events in the United Kingdom